Argiocnemis solitaria is a species of damselfly in the family Coenagrionidae. It is endemic to Mauritius.

Sources 

 Clausnitzer, V. 2005.  Argiocnemis solitaria.   2006 IUCN Red List of Threatened Species.   Downloaded on 9 August 2007.

Insects of Mauritius
Endemic fauna of Mauritius
Coenagrionidae
Insects described in 1872
Taxa named by Edmond de Sélys Longchamps
Taxonomy articles created by Polbot